St. Joseph Parish - designated for Polish immigrants in Gardner, Massachusetts, United States.

 Founded December 6, 1908. It is one of the Polish-American Roman Catholic parishes in New England in the Diocese of Worcester.

History 
The first Polish settler who came to Gardner was Jan Kulczyk. He landed in New York on April 2, 1892, and the next day he traveled to Gardner. Later, other Polish immigrants, including Jan Kijek, Peter Piascik, Paul Cychol, Francis Wiski, and Roman Kulczyk, joined him.

In 1903, members of the Polish settlement in Gardner began to organize associations and interest groups.

The first such organization was the Polish National Alliance which was founded in 1903. A few years later the organization entertained the idea of creating a community of fraternal aid. After many meetings and deliberations, the St. Joseph Society was founded on March 2, 1906.

Since September 11, 1906, the Society began paying its members five U.S. dollars a week to help the sick or handicapped.

On  May 5, 1907, a committee made up of Eugene Pliskowski, Stanley Hryniewicz, Roman Kulczyk, and Matthew Kodys bought a parcel of land at 358 Pleasant St.

After obtaining permission from Thomas D. Beaven, bishop of  Springfield, to establish the  St. Joseph Parish, the Polish settlers in Gardner welcomed Fr. Julius Rodziewicz as the first pastor.

On December 6, 1908, St. Joseph Parish was canonically established, and Fr. Julius Rodziewicz celebrated his first Mass in the  Holy Rosary Church.

In 2015 St. Joseph Churches has been closed.

Pastors 
 Fr. Juliusz Rodziewicz (1908-1912)
 Fr. Andrzej Krzywda (1912-1913)
 Fr. John Mardyrosiewicz (1913-1914)
 Fr. Stanisław Chlapowski (1914-1950)
 Fr. Władysław Radzik (1950-1957)
 Fr. Henry Banach (1957-1959)
 Fr. Józef Niedzwiecki (1959-1978)
 Fr. Kazimierz Kurzawski (1978-1991)
 Fr. Karol Borowski (1991-1993)
 Fr. Franciszek Piechocki (1993-1994)
 Fr. Thomas Tokarz (1994-2015)

References

Bibliography 
 
 
 
 The Official Catholic Directory in USA

External links 
 St. Joseph Parish -  ParishesOnline.com
 St. Joseph Parish - TheCatholicDirectory.com 
 Diocese of Worcester

Roman Catholic parishes of Diocese of Worcester
Polish-American Roman Catholic parishes in Massachusetts
Buildings and structures in Gardner, Massachusetts